Washington Freedom Futures was an American women’s soccer team and the top-level amateur team in the Washington Freedom Soccer Club hierarchy. The team was a member of the United Soccer Leagues W-League, the second tier of women’s soccer in the United States and Canada. The team plays in the Northeast Division of the Eastern Conference. The W-League team folded after the 2010 season.

The team played its home games in the stadium at Maryland SoccerPlex in Germantown, Maryland. The club's colors were blue, red and white.

The team was part of the official development system of the Washington Freedom Women's Professional Soccer franchise, one of the most successful women's soccer teams in America. The senior Freedom team originally competed in the professional Women's United Soccer Association from 2001 to 2003, then joined the W-League in 2006. Once play began in WPS, however, the senior team competed in that league, and the Freedom's reserves took their place in the second tier. In November 2009, the team name was changed from the Washington Freedom (W-League) to the Washington Freedom Futures, and Joanna Lohman was named the team's general manager.

Players

Squad 2010
As of 27 July 2009.

2010 coaching staff
As of 06 April 2010.

Year-by-year

The following sections give a history of the Freedom in the W-League, including those years when the W-League team was the senior team to provide historical background and comparison.

Annual Performance Record

Honors
 USL W-League Eastern Conference Champions 2009
 USL W-League Eastern Conference Champions 2008
 USL W-League Northeast Division Champions 2008
 USL W-League Champions 2007
 USL W-League Eastern Conference Champions 2007
 USL W-League Northeast Division Champions 2007

References

External links

Official Site
USL page for team

   

Washington Freedom
Reserve soccer teams in the United States
USL W-League (1995–2015) teams
2006 establishments in Maryland
2010 disestablishments in Maryland
Association football clubs established in 2006
Association football clubs disestablished in 2010